Boneshaker is the fifth studio album by Australian hard rock band Airbourne. It was released on 25 October 2019 via Spinefarm and was produced by American record producer, songwriter and music executive Dave Cobb.

It is the first and only Airbourne album to feature Matt "Harri" Harrison on rhythm guitar, taking the place of the band's rhythm guitarist and longtime original member David Roads, who left in 2017.

Track listing

Personnel 
 Joel O'Keeffe – lead vocals, lead guitar
 Justin Street – bass guitar, backing vocals
 Matt "Harri" Harrisson – rhythm guitar, backing vocals
 Ryan O'Keeffe – drums

Charts

References 

2019 albums
Airbourne (band) albums
Spinefarm Records albums
Albums produced by Dave Cobb